Gwyddyl Ffichti is a term that appears in the third series of Welsh Triads, apparently referring to the Picts. It was central to William Forbes Skene's argument that the Picts were a Goidelic, Celtic-speaking people and that their language was ancestral to modern Scottish Gaelic. The passage in which it appears is believed to be an invention of the 18th/19th century Welsh Antiquarian Iolo Morganwg. The suspicion of Morganwg's forgery was first raised by Skene himself in 1868:

While Skene admitted that the "authenticity of the Triads is not unexceptional", he maintained that the term was valid as it was also present in the Triads of Arthur and his Warriors. Skene revised his position on the nature of the Pictish language to suggest it was an amalgamation of "Welsh" and "Gaelic":

Notes

Bibliography

Welsh mythology
Picts